The Roman Catholic Diocese of Goya is in Argentina and is a suffragan of the Archdiocese of Corrientes.  It was established by Blessed John XXIII on  10 April 1961.

Bishops

Ordinaries
Alberto Devoto (1961–1984)
Luis Teodorico Stöckler (1985–2002)
Ricardo Oscar Faifer (2002–2015)
Adolfo Ramón Canecín (2015- )

Coadjutor bishop
Adolfo Ramón Canecín (2014-2015)

Other priest of this diocese who became bishop
Ricardo Rösch, appointed Bishop of Concordia in 1961

Territorial losses

External links and references
 

Roman Catholic dioceses in Argentina
Roman Catholic Ecclesiastical Province of Corrientes
Christian organizations established in 1961
Roman Catholic dioceses and prelatures established in the 20th century
1961 establishments in Argentina